Sedrata (Berber: Isedraten) is a district in Souk Ahras Province, Algeria. It was named after its capital, Sedrata.

Municipalities
The district is further divided into 3 municipalities:
Sedrata
Khemissa 
Aïn Soltane 

Districts of Souk Ahras Province